The Songs I Love may refer to:

 The Songs I Love (album), an album by Perry Como
 "The Songs I Love" (song), a 1963 song with music written by Jimmy Van Heusen and lyrics by Sammy Cahn